Nain rugs are constructed using the Persian knot and typically have between 300 and 700 knots per square inch. The pile is usually very high quality wool, clipped short, and silk is often used as highlighting for detail in the design.

See also
Knots per sq cm

References

Persian rugs and carpets